Sif Rykær (born 16 January 1988) is a Danish footballer who plays as a midfielder for KoldingQ in the Elitedivisionen and formerly for the Denmark women's national football team.

Club career
She started playing for Haderslev FK, her youth years. She moved to Iceland in a young age, to join Valur. With the team, she won the Úrvalsdeild kvenna in 2008. She moved back to Denmark in the 2009, to play for IK Skovbakken, were she also won the Danish Cup in 2009. First in 2017, she moved to the league club VSK Aarhus, but moved to KoldingQ the following year.

International career
She made international debit on the Danish national team on 2 March 2011, at the 2011 Algarve Cup. She hasn't been part of the National team, since 2015. Although she has represent the Danish national under-23 team back in 2009 and has played several matches for both the youth and junior national teams.

She participated at the 2006 UEFA Women's Under-19 Championship in Switzerland and again in the 2007 UEFA Women's Under-19 Championship in Iceland.

Honours

Club
KoldingQ
 Danish Cup
 Winner: 2009
Valur
 Úrvalsdeild kvenna
 Winner: 2008

References

External links
Profile at Danish Football Association 
 
 

1988 births
Living people
VSK Aarhus (women) players
Danish women's footballers
Denmark women's international footballers
Women's association football midfielders